Pabstiella wacketii is a species of orchid plant native to Brazil.

References 

wacketii
Flora of Brazil